The Chongqing–Lichuan railway, or the Yuli railway is a railway connecting central Chongqing with the Hubei city of Lichuan.

Services
Together with the Hankou–Yichang and Yichang–Lichuan sections of the Huhanrong mainline, the Chongqing–Lichuan line forms what was, until the completion of the Xi'an–Chengdu high-speed railway, the only high-speed rail connection between the Sichuan Basin and the rest of China. It carries numerous high-speed trains running between the cities of the Sichuan Basin (Chengdu and Chongqing) and various destinations in the central and eastern China.

It was said that when the Yuli railway and the relevant sections of the Huhanrong mainline are completed, one would be able to travel from Chongqing to Shanghai in just 10 hours. As of mid-2015, no service this fast seem  to exist yet (there is no G-series train directly to Shanghai), but several D-series trains do make it from Chongqing to Shanghai in 13–15 hours. There are also G-series trains running from Chongqing to Beijing in 12.5 hours (G309).

Construction history
Construction work started in the late 2008; the plans were for it to be completed within four years. As of August 2012, it was expected that the railway will be completed by the end of 2013.

The railway's Hanjiatuo Bridge over the Yangtze is said to have the longest main span among the world's double-track railway cable-stayed bridges.

Two sets of CRH2A high speed train-sets commenced testing of the completed Yuli railway line on December 11, 2013, from Chengdu to Chongqing. It was expected for the line to be opened by the end of December 2013.

The Chongqing–Lichuan line was opened to conventional rail traffic at the end of December 2013, and full high speed services were expected to commence by the end of June 2014.

See also

 List of railway lines in China

References

2013 establishments in China
Railway lines opened in 2013
Railway lines in China
Rail transport in Chongqing
Rail transport in Hubei